Ellsworth Clewer "Sonny" Wisecarver Jr. (15 June 1929 – 22 November 2005), called the Woo Woo Kid, was an American who became infamous as a teen in 1944 for having affairs with older women. His behavior sparked public scandal, primarily because of his age; at age 14 he ran off with a mother of two, only to do so again a year later.  It was the latter incident that sparked his notoriety; Eleanor Deveny, the woman he fled with the second time, was arrested and charged with contributing to the delinquency of a minor.

As for Sonny, his parents had him declared an incorrigible delinquent. He spent time in the California Youth Authority, a state penal facility for juveniles.

In his book The Rape of the A*P*E*, Allan Sherman credits the Wisecarver scandal and resulting publicity as the official start of the American sexual revolution.

Wisecarver's scandalous affairs were the basis for the 1987 film In the Mood, in which Wisecarver makes a cameo appearance as a mailman.  Patrick Dempsey played the role of Wisecarver. An interview with Wisecarver also appears on the original VHS of the movie.

Wisecarver spent his final days in a mobile home in Yucaipa, California, in the United States. He died of lung cancer at the age of 76, at a Veterans hospital in Loma Linda, California. An Air Force veteran of the Korean War, Wisecarver is buried in Riverside National Cemetery in Riverside, California.

References

External links
 People v Wisecarver. Accessed 28 January 2006
 https://news.google.com/newspapers?nid=1842&dat=19451120&id=GBksAAAAIBAJ&sjid=dsYEAAAAIBAJ&pg=5744,2280760
 

1929 births
2005 deaths
Burials at Riverside National Cemetery
Deaths from lung cancer in California
People from Greater Los Angeles
United States Air Force personnel of the Korean War